is a 2017 Japanese animated supernatural disaster film based on the Black Butler manga series written and illustrated by Yana Toboso. The film was produced by A-1 Pictures, directed by Noriyuki Abe and written by Hiroyuki Yoshino, featuring character designs by Minako Shiba and music by Yasunori Mitsuda. It premiered in Japan on January 21, 2017. It covers the  arc , the sixth arc of the manga series.

A few months after its Japanese release, Funimation announced that they had licensed and would screen the film in a limited theatrical release in North America later in June of that year.

Plot
The story is based on the sinking of the RMS Titanic in 1912. Ciel, Sebastian, and Snake board the luxury liner Campania on her maiden voyage to investigate the mysterious Aurora Society, rumored to perform unethical experiments to raise the dead. On board is also Elizabeth and her family. In a secret Aurora Society meeting, Ciel and Sebastian witness Doctor Rian Stoker use a machine to reanimate a dead woman, who starts attacking and killing the attendants. Ciel finds himself trapped in the ship's cargo with Elizabeth and Snake, where they realize that Stoker brought thousands more reanimated corpses on board. Sebastian rescues them. Upon interrogating Stoker, Ciel discovers that an even larger batch of corpses is stored in another area of the ship; that batch promptly awakens and begin killing the ship's crew and passengers. Amidst the chaos, the ship crashes into an iceberg and starts sinking, giving Sebastian and the Grim Reapers, including Grell, only a few hours.

The group discovers that Undertaker was behind the reanimated corpses and is a Grim Reaper himself. While fighting him, Sebastian is wounded by Undertaker's death scythe and his Cinematic Reel is played; Undertaker witnesses the early moments of Ciel and Sebastian's relationship, when Ciel summoned the demon, when they returned home, and Sebastian training Ciel for his royal duties until he re-entered society, receiving his title as Earl Phantomhive. Stoker falls to his death; Ciel is able to snatch Undertaker's funeral lockets as the Reaper escapes. Sebastian and Ciel barely escape the sunken ship on a lifeboat but find themselves surrounded by the remaining corpses. Knowing that the corpses will attack the other survivors should they attempt to escape, Sebastian has no choice but to fight all of them himself to protect Ciel. At dawn, with all corpses disposed of, a rescue boat appears to save them.

In the post-credits, William rescues Grell and Ronald, scolding them for failing in their task, while Sebastian and Ciel meet their friends aboard the rescue boat.

Voice cast

Production
An animated film adaptation of the manga was announced on the official anime's Twitter account on October 10, 2015, with the cast from the anime television returning to reprise their roles in the film. It was later revealed in February 2016 that the film would be an adaptation of the manga's Gōka Kyakusen story arc (volumes 11–14), titled Black Butler: Book of the Atlantic, with the main staff from the Black Butler: Book of Circus anime television series also returning. The film was released in Japanese theaters on January 21, 2017. Sid performed the film's theme song, titled .

References

External links
  
 
 

Black Butler
2017 anime films
2017 black comedy films
2017 comedy horror films
2017 fantasy films
2017 horror films
2010s comedy mystery films
A-1 Pictures
Japanese adult animated films
Anime comedy films
Anime films based on manga
Aniplex
The Devil in film
Films about death
Films about seafaring accidents or incidents
Films about undead
Films directed by Noriyuki Abe
Films set on cruise ships
Films set in the Atlantic Ocean
Funimation
2010s Japanese-language films
Japanese animated fantasy films
Japanese animated horror films
Japanese black comedy films
Japanese supernatural films
Japanese comedy mystery films
Supernatural anime and manga